The 2016 US Open Lawn Bowls Championship was held at Sarasota Lawn Bowling Club, Florida, United States, in November 2016.

MZ-Line 4H 30D

Winners

Open men's pairs

References

Bowls in the United States
Sports in Sarasota, Florida